Bastardiser is the first full-length album by Swiss mathcore band Knut, released in Europe in 1998.

Track listing
 "Crawling on All Fours" – 3:19
 "Engine" – 4:14
 "The Whip" – 3:01
 "High-Low" – 3:00
 "Merge" – 4:16
 "Wiped Out" – 2:24
 "Descent" – 4:18
 "Crouch" – 10:49

Knut (band) albums
1998 albums
Hydra Head Records albums
Albums with cover art by Jacob Bannon